Philip Max Neilsen is an Australian poet, fiction writer and editor. He teaches poetry at the University of Queensland and was previously professor of creative writing at the Queensland University of Technology.

Biography

Neilsen was born in Brisbane, Queensland, Australia. His grandparents and great grandparents were emigrants from Norway, Scotland, England and Germany. He attended Brisbane Grammar School and the University of Queensland where he gained honours, masters and doctoral degrees in English and taught for nine years. He founded the creative writing program at the Queensland University of Technology in 1997, the first in Queensland. He has been a member of the Literature Board of the Australia Council for the Arts. Previously, he has been Chair of the Queensland Writers Centre and Chair of PEN Australia North. He established the Imago: New Writing Literary Magazine with poet Helen Horton. Neilsen is married to lawyer and writer Mhairead MacLeod, and was previously married to public servant Samantha Organ-Moore (now Samantha Palmer).

Writing and editing

Neilsen’s work ranges from satire and fabulism to lyricism and social realism, and explores social, environmental and personal subjects. Literary influences he has mentioned include W. H. Auden, Billy Collins, Elizabeth Bishop, Franz Kafka, Simon Armitage, Sharon Olds, John Berryman, Carolyn Forché and Judith Wright. His poetry earned a Young Writer’s Fellowship from the Australia Council in 1976.  Edward Britton , a young adult novel co-authored with Gary Crew was a CBC Australian Notable Book in 2001. His work has been translated into Chinese, German, Korean and Serbian. His poetry was included in the 2008 Norton anthology The Making of a Sonnet (Eds. Edward Hirsch & Eavan Boland), The Penguin Anthology of Australian Poetry (Ed. John Kinsella, 2009), Australian Poetry Since 1788 (Eds. Geoffrey Lehmann and Robert Gray, 2011), The Turnrow Anthology of Contemporary Australian Poetry (University of Louisiana, 2014) and The Best Australian Poems 2017 (Ed. Sarah Holland-Batt) (Black Inc.)

He wrote the first monograph of literary criticism on David Malouf’s work, Imagined Lives (UQP, 1990 & 1996) and edited the first collections of Australian satirical poetry The Penguin Book of Australian Satirical Verse (1986) and The Sting in the Wattle (UQP, 1993).  Neilsen’s poetry has been acclaimed by Les Murray, John Kinsella, Sarah Holland-Batt, Bronwyn Lea, Martin Duwell and Bruce Dawe, among others. His work has been shortlisted for an Aurealis Award, Fair Australia Prize, Woorilla Poetry Prize and the ASAL Gold Medal. He has won prizes in the Philip Bacon Ekphrasis Poetry Award and the MPU International Poetry Competition. His book "Wildlife of Berlin" was shortlisted for the Kenneth Slessor Poetry Prize in the New South Wales Premier's Literary Awards, 2019. 

His areas of research include creative writing therapy in the promotion of mental health, eco-criticism, and environmental poetry. He currently teaches poetry writing at the University of Queensland.

Poetry collections

Faces of a Sitting Man (Makar Press, 1975).
The Art of Lying (Makar Press, 1979)
Australian Poets on Tape: Philip Roberts & Philip Neilsen (UQP, 1980)
Life Movies (QCP, 1981)
We’ll All Go Together (with Barry O’Donohue)(QCP, 1983)
Without an Alibi (Salt: Cambridge, 2008)
Wildlife of Berlin (University of Western Australia Publishing, 2018)

Children’s and young adult books

Emma and the Megahero  (Reed Books, 1995)
The Lie  (Lothian, 1997) 
The Wombat King,   (Lothian, 1997)
Edward Britton  (with Gary Crew) (Lothian, 2000)
Splot the Viking  (Penguin, 2008)

Scholarly Books

Imagined Lives: A Study of David Malouf (University of Queensland Press, 1990 & revised 1996)
The Cambridge Companion to Creative Writing Co-edited with David Morley (Cambridge University Press, 2013)
Creative Arts in Counseling and Mental Health Co-edited with Robert King and Felicity Baker (SAGE, 2015)

Edited Anthologies

The Penguin Book of Australian Satirical Verse Edited by Philip Neilsen (Penguin Books, 1986) 
The Sting in the Wattle Edited by Philip Neilsen (University of Queensland Press, 1993) 
50 Years of Queensland Poetry Co-edited with Helen Horton (Central Queensland University Press, 1998) 
Difficult Love: Short Stories Co-edited with Helen Horton (Central Queensland University Press, 2000)

Short stories

His short stories have appeared in The State of the Art (ed. Frank Moorhouse), Paradise to Paranoia (eds. Nigel Krauth and Robyn Sheehan), Latitudes (ed. Susan Johnson), The Dark House (ed. Gary Crew) and journals such as Southerly, Overland and Linq. The autobiographical essay ‘Humility’ appeared in Eleven Saving Virtues (ed. Ross Fitzgerald). A digital story ‘The Storyteller’ is available at http://www.kgurbanvillage.com.au/sharing/digital/philip.shtm

References

Review of Without an Alibi in Australian Book Review June, 2008 
Review of Wildlife of Berlin in Australian Poetry Review by Martin Duwell, May, 2018 
Review of Wildlife of Berlin in the Australian by Geoff Page, July, 2019 
Review of Wildlife of Berlin in Westerly by Lucy Walding, 2019

External links

QUT profile at http://www.creativeindustries.qut.edu.au/about_us/staff-profile/profile.jsp
Web site at http://philipneilsen.org/

Full list of works at https://www.austlit.edu.au/austlit/search/page?query=Philip+Neilsen&token=KdKmAMP&facetSampleSize=0&facetValuesSize=0&blendMax=y&count=50

Australian children's writers
Australian poets
Australian people of English descent
Australian people of Norwegian descent
Australian people of German descent
Australian people of Scottish descent
Living people
Academic staff of Queensland University of Technology
Year of birth missing (living people)